Baroness Anna Elisabeth Franziska Adolphine Wilhelmine Louise Maria von Droste zu Hülshoff, known as Annette von Droste-Hülshoff (10 January 179724 May 1848), was a 19th-century German poet, novelist, and composer of Classical music. She was also the author of the novella Die Judenbuche.

In an article for the 1913 Catholic Encyclopedia, Francis Joste wrote, "The fame of the poetess rests chiefly on her lyric poems, her pastorales, and her ballads. In the poetic representation of nature, few can equal her. The poetical works of Annette von Droste-Hülshoff are imperishable. What makes them so is their originality, the proof that they are the works of a genius. It is this too that gained for their author the well-earned title of 'Germany's greatest poetess.'"

Biography

Early years

Annette von Droste-Hülshoff was born at the castle of Burg Hülshoff (now a part of Havixbeck) in the Prince-Bishopric of Münster. Her family, the Barons Droste zu Hülshoff, belonged to the oldest Roman Catholic aristocracy of Westphalia. Her father Clemens August von Droste zu Hülshoff (1760–1826) was a learned man who was interested in ancient history and languages, ornithology, botany, music and the supernatural. Her mother Therese Luise (1772–1853) came from another aristocratic Westphalian family, the Barons von Haxthausen. Annette was the second of four children: she had an elder sister Maria Anna (nicknamed "Jenny", 1795–1859) and two younger brothers, Werner Konstantin (1798–1867) and Ferdinand (1800–1829). Annette was born one month prematurely and only saved by the intervention of a nurse. She suffered from problems with her health throughout her life, including headaches and eye troubles.

Droste was educated by private tutors in ancient languages, French, natural history, mathematics and music (she inherited considerable musical talent from her father). She began to write as a child; 50 poems written between 1804 and 1814 have been preserved. Droste's maternal grandfather, Baron Werner Adolf von Haxthausen, had remarried after the death of Annette's grandmother in 1772 and built himself a new castle, Schloss Bökerhof, in the village of Bökendorf, Paderborn. Here his sons from his second marriage, Werner and August, had formed an intellectual circle. They were in contact with such celebrated cultural figures as the Brothers Grimm, Clemens Brentano, Friedrich Schlegel, Adele and Johanna Schopenhauer. Droste visited Schloss Bökerhof frequently and made the acquaintance of Wilhelm Grimm. She and her sister contributed folk tales from Westphalia to the Grimms' famous collection of fairy stories. However, neither Grimm nor her uncles gave any encouragement to her literary ambitions. The only literary figure to recognize her talent was Anton Matthias Sprickmann (1749–1833), whom she first met in 1812. Sprickmann was the founder of the theatre in Münster and had known important 18th-century poets Matthias Claudius and Friedrich Gottlieb Klopstock. Droste trusted Sprickmann's judgement and showed him many of her early works, including the unfinished tragedy Berta oder die Alpen ("Berta, or The Alps", 1813). Other examples of her juvenilia are the tale in verse Walter (1818) and a novel Ledwina (begun in 1819 but never completed).

In 1819–1820, Annette spent a year staying with the Haxthausen family at Schloss Bökerhof, interrupted only by a stay at the nearby spa town of Bad Driburg, where she hoped to find a cure for her health problems. Here she became romantically involved with Heinrich Straube (1794–1847), a Lutheran law student with literary interests, who was a friend of her uncle Baron August von Haxthausen. What happened next is unclear, but it appears that Annette's Aunt, Baroness Anna von Haxthausen (who was in fact four years her junior), and other relatives at Schloss Bökerhof disapproved of Annette's decision to have a serious relationship with a commoner. For this reason, the Baroness von Haxthausen masterminded a society intrigue intended to destroy the relationship in a very public manner. While Straube was away pursuing his legal studies at the University of Göttingen, August von Arnswaldt, a Lutheran aristocrat with literary ambitions, pretended to pursue Annette romantically. At first flattered by von Arnswaldt's attentions, Annette gave some indications she was in love with him, before telling him she was committed to Heinrich Straube. By this time it was too late, as von Arnswaldt had all the evidence he needed. He traveled to Göttingen and gave Straube proof of Annette's behaviour. The two men wrote a joint letter (which has not been preserved), breaking off all contact with her. She never saw either man again. A few years later, August von Arnswaldt married a widowed Baroness Anna von Haxthausen, the ringleader of the intrigue. Straube became a lawyer in Kassel and married in 1824. When he died in 1847, a lock of Annette's hair was found among his possessions. The ensuing scandal was a catastrophe for Annette and severely damaged both her reputation and her marriage prospects. Feeling betrayed by the role that her own relatives had played, Annette refused to visit Schloss Bökerhof for the next 18 years.

Droste's earliest poems are derivative and conventional but in 1820 her work began to show marked originality when she embarked on a cycle of Christian poetry, Das geistliche Jahr ("The Spiritual Year"). Droste intended to write one poem for each Sunday and Feast Day of the church year and the cycle was meant as a gift to her devout grandmother, but when Droste had completed 25 poems, she realised they showed too many traces of major depression and spiritual doubt, so she shelved the work until 1839 when a friend persuaded her to complete the series. Even then she did not publish the poems and they were only appeared posthumously in 1851.

When her father died in 1826 she moved with her mother and sister to a small country estate near Hülshoff called Rüschhaus. Here she led a constricted, monotonous existence, broken only by a few trips to the Rhine and Bonn. She composed poetry, but not prolifically. In 1834 her sister Jenny married Baron Joseph von Laßberg, an important collector, editor, and publisher of medieval Middle High German epic poetry. The following summer, Annette and her mother travelled to visit Baron von Laßberg's estate of Schloss Eppishausen in the Swiss Alps. She was inspired by the scenery and easily befriended her brother in law, but neither he nor his friends shared her interest in modern German poetry and Droste's hopes that the Baron might publish her work came to nothing.

Droste now entrusted the publication of her first book to two friends, Christoph Bernhard Schlüter and Wilhelm Junkmann. They had little experience of the literary world and chose the Münster-based publisher Aschendorff. Droste would have preferred a non-regional publisher rather than a Westphalian one as Westphalia had a reputation as a cultural backwater and few people bought books there. The collection appeared in 1838 in a print-run of 500 copies, of which only 74 were sold. It contained three long narrative poems (Das Hospiz auf dem großem Saint-Bernard, Das Vermächtnis des Arztes and Die Schlacht in Loener Bruch) and a handful of lyrics. Although they were issued under the name "Annette Elisabeth von D.H.", her family did not approve. Droste found the failure of her book "humiliating."

Literary success

The year 1840 marked a turning point in her career, however. In 1838, Droste had begun to frequent a literary salon in Münster, presided over by Elise Rüdiger, the "Hecken-Schriftstellergesellschaft." One of its members was the young poet Levin Schücking. Droste had known his mother, the poetess Katharina Schücking-Busch, and had first met Levin in 1831. Schücking had also published an admiring review of Droste's poetry collection and sought her help in writing his own book, Das malerische und romantische Westfalen ("Picturesque and Romantic Westphalia", 1840). The two soon formed a close friendship and Droste wrote a number of ballads for inclusion in the book, among them "Das Fräulein von Rodenschild" and "Der Tod des Erzbischofs Engelbert von Köln". Schücking encouraged her renewed literary creativity. In the winter of 1840—1841 she wrote her famous novella Die Judenbuche (The Jew's Beech, published 1842), inspired by a real murder near Bökerhof in the late 18th century. The following autumn and winter, Droste and Schücking stayed at her brother-in-law's castle at Meersburg on Lake Constance, where Schücking had been given the task of cataloguing Baron von Laßberg's private library. While there, Schücking told Annette that her talent lay in lyric poetry, which relied on rare moments of inspiration. Droste disagreed: she had no problem composing poetry in her head but had difficulty writing it down and the failure of her first book had not encouraged her to make the effort. Now she had a sympathetic reader in Schücking, she began to write in earnest, producing about fifty poems between October 1841 and April 1842. They include poems dedicated to Schücking, often on the theme of ageing (e.g. "Kein Wort", "O frage nicht"), and poems of self-analysis such as "Das Spiegelbild" ("The Image in the Mirror") and "Die Taxuswand" ("The Yew Hedge"), which looks back to her unhappy love affair with Straube. Other lyrics are the nature poems collected in the cycle "Heidebilder" ("Heath Pictures"), including such famous pieces as "Die Krähen" ("The Crows"), "Der Hünenstein", "Die Mergelgrube" ("The Marl Pit") and "Der Knabe im Moor" ("The Boy on the Moor"). These often have an element of magical realism and supernatural terror.

In April 1842, Schücking left Schloss Meersburg to take up a job as a tutor to an aristocratic family. Droste returned to Rüschhaus the same summer. The pair would never be so close again. Droste's literary productivity declined, but she did compose a few more poems, including the supernatural story "Spiritus familiaris." In September 1844, the prestigious publisher Cotta issued a large collection of her poems from the 1840s. This time Droste enjoyed great success and the book received admiring reviews from many important intellectual figures.

In 1844, Classical music composer Robert Schuman had become an admirer of her poetry, which he praised in a letter to Hans Christian Andersen. However, the poetess declined Clara Schumann's request for an opera libretto on her husband's behalf, but Robert Schumann did set Annette von Droste-Hülshoff's poem, Das Hirtenfeuer, as Op. 59 no. 5. In time, Droste was acknowledged as the greatest female German author of the 19th century.

Final years

Meanwhile, her relationship with Schücking had cooled. In 1843, Schücking had married Baroness Louise von Gall. When the couple visited Schloss Meersburg for four weeks in May 1844, the two women intensely disliked one another. Droste published a poem "Lebt wohl" ("Farewell") in the literary journal Morgenblatt, effectively saying goodbye to Schücking. Schücking also used his own literary works to mark his distance from Droste. In 1846, he published two novels. The first, Die Ritterbürtigen, contained a highly critical portrait of the Westphalian aristocracy. This caused Droste embarrassment as Schücking had made use of private information from conversations with her. The second novel, Eine dunkle Tat, included characters resembling himself and Droste. The character of Katharina, based on Droste, is maternal, controlling, possessive, and treats the protagonist as a substitute child. As a result of these publications and her dislike of Schücking's radical politics, Droste made a decisive break with him. Nevertheless, after Droste's death, Schücking helped publicise her works, publishing the collection of her final poems, Letzte Gaben, in 1860 and an edition of her collected works in 1878–9. Important poems from her last years include "Mondesaufgang" ("Moonrise"), "Durchwachte Nacht" ("Sleepless Night") and "Im Grase" ("In the Grass").

The profits from her book had helped Droste to buy a small vine-covered villa known as Fürstenhäusle in Meersburg, while renovating the house, she lived in her brother in law's Schloss from 1846 until her death in May 1848, probably from tuberculosis.

Character of her poetry
The critic Margaret Atkinson wrote:

Musical activity
Droste received early instruction in piano and later in singing. In 1821 she was given a composition manual, Einige Erklärungen über den General-Baß, written by her uncle Maximilian-Friedrich von Droste zu Hülshoff (a friend of Joseph Haydn) and announced her intention to learn it by heart. Seventy-four Lieder by Droste survive as well as fragments and sketches of 4 unrealized operas.

In popular culture 
 In her native Havixbeck, the castle that is Droste's birthplace, Burg Hülshoff, is now a museum with a retrospective of her work and is open to the public.
 Asteroid 12240 Droste-Hülshoff, discovered by astronomer Freimut Börngen in 1988, was named in her memory.
 Annette von Droste-Hülshoff is the protagonist of Karen Duve's novel Fräulein Nettes kurzer Sommer, Galiani, Berlin 2018, .

Works 
 Gedichte (1838)
 Die Judenbuche (novella, 1842)
 Gedichte (Poems, 1844)
 Westfälische Schilderungen ("Westphalian Illustrations", 1845)
 Das geistliche Jahr (The Spiritual Year, cycle of poems, 1851)
 Letzte Gaben ("Last Gifts", poems, 1860)
 Briefe von Annette von Droste-Hülshoff und Levin Schücking (Letters from Annette von Droste-Hülshoff and Levin Schücking)
Lieder mit Pianoforte-Begleitung. Componirt von Annette von Droste-Hülshoff (Songs, posthumously edited 1871 by Christoph Bernhard Schlüter)

See also 

 Biedermeier

References 

 

 Margaret A. Atkinson: introduction to Poems by Annette von Droste-Hülshoff (Oxford University Press, 1964) OCLC: 742188985 
 Winfried Freund Annette von Droste-Hülshoff (DTV, 1998; 2011 edition), 
 Clemens Heselhaus (ed), Annette von Droste-Hülshoff, Werke, Carl Hanser Verlag, 1984

Further reading 
 

 John Guthrie, Annette von Droste-Hülshoff: A German Poet between Romanticism and Realism, Berg, 1989, 
 Margaret Laura Mare, Annette von Droste-Hülshoff, University of Nebraska Press, 1965, OCLC: 460375644

External links 
 
 
 Works by Annette von Droste-Hülshoff on Zeno.org
 Compositions by Droste and settings of her poems at IMSLP
 Nach 100 Jahren möchte ich gelesen werden - German site with extracts from Droste's letters

1797 births
1848 deaths
19th-century classical composers
19th-century German composers
19th-century German novelists
19th-century German poets
19th-century German women writers
Biedermeier writers
German baronesses
German Catholic poets
German classical composers
German women classical composers
German-language poets
German Roman Catholics
German women novelists
German women poets
Magic realism writers
People from Coesfeld (district)
People from the Prince-Bishopric of Münster
Writers from North Rhine-Westphalia
19th-century women composers
19th-century deaths from tuberculosis
Tuberculosis deaths in Germany